Flight 108 may refer to:
 Canadian Pacific Air Lines Flight 108, bombed by Albert Guay on 9 September 1949
 Nürnberger Flugdienst Flight 108, crashed on 8 February 1988
 Aeropostal Alas de Venezuela Flight 108, crashed on 5 March 1991

0108